Santa Rosa District is one of five districts of the province El Collao in Puno Region, Peru.

History 
Santa Rosa District was created on May 5, 1854.

Geography 
Some of the highest mountains of the district are listed below:

Ethnic groups 
The people in the district are mainly indigenous citizens of Aymara descent. Aymara is the language which the majority of the population (80.88%) learnt to speak in childhood, 18.39% of the residents started speaking using the Spanish language (2007 Peru Census).

Mayors 
 2007-2014: Ismael Acero Mamani.

Festivities 
 May 3; Fiesta de las Cruces.
 May 5: Aniversario
 August 30: Santa Rosa de Lima

See also 
 Lurisquta
 Qillqatani

References

External links